Emmalocera latilimbella is a species of snout moth in the genus Emmalocera. It was described by Ragonot in 1890, and is known from New Guinea and Australia.

References

Moths described in 1890
Emmalocera